Solar: Live at Sweet Basil is a 1991 live album by McCoy Tyner released on the Sweet Basil label. It was recorded in June 1991 at Sweet Basil in New York City and features a live performance by Tyner with bassist Avery Sharpe and drummer Aaron Scott. Another album of the evening's concert was released as Key of Soul (1992). The Allmusic review by Ken Dryden states "This solid concert is easily recommended to fans of McCoy Tyner".

1997 release became a 2CD compilation album combined with Key of Soul (1992).

Track listing

Original release (1991) 
 "Solar"  (Miles Davis) - 9:39
 "Don't Get Around Much Anymore" (Ellington, Russell) - 12:02
 "Darn That Dream" (DeLange, Van Heusen) - 6:11
 "Blues for T.M." - 12:53
 "La Habana Sol" - 11:45
All compositions by McCoy Tyner except as indicated
Recorded at Sweet Basil, New York, New York on June 14, 1991

Compilation version (1997) 
Disk one
 As same as the original release of 1991.

Disk two
 As same as Key of Soul (1992).

Personnel 
 McCoy Tyner – piano
 Avery Sharpe – bass
 Aaron Scott – drums

References 

1991 live albums
McCoy Tyner live albums
Live albums recorded in New York City